Inuyasha the Movie: Swords of an Honorable Ruler is a 2003 Japanese animated fantasy adventure film based on Inuyasha manga series written and illustrated by Rumiko Takahashi. The film is directed by Toshiya Shinohara, written by Katsuyuki Sumisawa, and produced by Sunrise. The film was released in Japan on December 20, 2003.

In the film, Inuyasha and Sesshomaru are forced to work together to seal the evil So'unga, their father's third sword, when it is awakened from its sheath.

The film marks the third film for the Inuyasha series, following The Castle Beyond the Looking Glass (2002) and followed up by Fire on the Mystic Island (2004).

Plot

Two centuries ago, the great dog-demon Tōga denies his elder son Sesshomaru's request for ownership of two of his swords, Tessaiga and So'unga. Afterwards, Tōga heads to a mansion guarded by an army of samurai where his human wife, Lady Izayoi, is giving birth. The army's leader, Takemaru of Setsuna, who is in love with Izayoi, attempts to kill her by stabbing her and setting the mansion aflame. Tōga defeats the army and cuts off one of Takemaru's arms to enter the mansion, and uses his third sword, Tenseiga, to revive Izayoi. Tōga forces her to flee the burning mansion with their newborn, whom he names Inuyasha, then fights Takemaru. At a safe distance, Izayoi witness the mansion collapses on both men and Toga's spirit wishes her to live a long life with Inuyasha.

In the present day, Inuyasha travels through the Bone-Eater's Well from the Feudal era to visit Kagome Higurashi in the modern era. Unbeknownst to them, Kagome's family uncover an ancient sword as part of their shrine's treasures, which turns out to be So'unga. The spirit of So'unga's sheath, Saya, emerges before the sword finds its way to Inuyasha and Kagome. Saya tells Inuyasha that he must master the sword before it can destroy the modern world, but once he holds it, it possesses his arm and reverts him to his demon form, forcing him to return to the Feudal era. Inuyasha's friends, monk Miroku, demon slayer Sango, fox demon Shippo, and Sango's nekomata companion Kirara attempt to stop him, only to escape once Inuyasha uses the sword's deadly Dragon Twister attack. Kagome takes Saya with her to the Feudal era and reunites with everyone including Inuyasha's mentor Myoga, who knows Saya. They are eventually accompanied by blacksmith Totosai, the creator of Tōga's swords.

The possessed Inuyasha runs into his older brother, Sesshomaru, who battles Inuyasha for having taken up So’unga. So’unga orders Inuyasha to attack Sesshomaru's company, Jaken and Rin, until Kagome intervenes and uses the Beads of Subjugation necklace command on Inuyasha to release him from So’unga's possession. After So’unga flies off to find a new host, Sesshomaru leaves Jaken and Rin behind, while Inuyasha leaves an unconscious Kagome with them, vowing to destroy So’unga himself. After being joined by her friends, Totosai reveals that So’unga is possessed by an ancient evil demon, following its sealing since there were no instructions given by Tōga as to what to do with it following his death. Meanwhile, So’unga retrieves Sesshomaru’s severed arm from the past and revives Takemaru, who, equipped with the sword and a new body, vows revenge on Tōga by killing his sons. Takemaru takes over a nearby castle and slays its army, resurrecting the approximately two-thousand soldiers as an army of the undead, as well as opening a portal to the netherworld.

Kagome and the rest of the group, including Jaken and Rin, join Inuyasha and Sesshomaru in a battle against Takemaru’s army. Despite inflicting heavy casualties on the soldiers, Miroku uses his Wind Tunnel to eliminate the rest. Kagome informs Inuyasha that, according to Totosai, the only way to defeat Takemaru and So’unga is to combine the forces of Tessaiga's Backlash Wave and the Dragon Strike of Sesshomaru's Tōkijin; Inuyasha initially refuses, noting that he and Sesshomaru could never fight side-by-side. Inuyasha kills Takemaru, forcing So’unga to form a physical body of its own. Inuyasha and Sesshomaru continuously fail to destroy Takemaru individually; the brothers eventually give in and use the powers of their swords to destroy So’unga's body and send the sword into the netherworld. Tōga’s spirit appears, remarking that he's proud of his sons before the portal to the netherworld closes. Sesshomaru departs with Jaken and Rin as Inuyasha and his allies look over the surrounding environment turning back to normal.

Voice cast

Production
Like the second film, the third film is produced by the same staff members from the first film: Toshiya Shinohara directed the film at Sunrise, Katsuyuki Sumisawa wrote the screenplay, Hideyuki Motohashi designed the characters and acted as a chief animation director, and Kaoru Wada composed the music. Original creator and mangaka Rumiko Takahashi personally designed the human form of Inuyasha and Sesshomaru's father, Dog General, as his human form was never shown in the manga and the television series.

The theme song, "Four Seasons", is performed by Namie Amuro.

Release
The film was released in Japanese theaters on December 20, 2003.

Notes

References

External links

2003 anime films
Demons in film
Japanese animated fantasy films
Films based on works by Rumiko Takahashi
Films set in feudal Japan
Swords of an Honorable Ruler
2000s Japanese-language films
Odex
Viz Media anime
Films scored by Kaoru Wada

ja:犬夜叉 (映画)#犬夜叉 天下覇道の剣